Hereiti Bernardino (born 21 May 1993) is a French Polynesian track and field sprinter. She competed in the 100 metres event at the 2013 World Championships in Athletics in Moscow, Russia and also at the 2017 World Championship in London. 

In 2019, she competed in the Pacific Games in Apia, Samoa, being the first Tahitian sprinter on a podium (with a bronze medal) since Katia Sandford and Albertine AN in 1991. However, she prefers the 200m and especially the 400m. She holds the 400m record for French Polynesia.

Bernardino competed at the 2022 World Athletics Championships in Eugene, Oregon and finished 45th overall.

International competitions

References

External links

1993 births
Living people
People from Papeete
French Polynesian female sprinters
World Athletics Championships athletes for French Polynesia